Vikash Ranjan Das (born Mahmudul Hasan 10 December 1990) is a Bangladeshi cricketer who plays as a batsman and off-spinner for Chittagong Division.

Hasan later changed his religion from Islam to Hinduism and named as Vikas Ranjan Das.

Youth career 
Hasan has represented Bangladesh at under-19 level. He has the record for scoring the most number of ducks in U19 One Day International (ODI) history, with seven. He is also the only batsman to be dismissed for ducks in 7 times in Youth ODI history.

He has played for Bangladesh U19 team in nine Test matches and 54 One Day Internationals. He captained the side in his first five ODIs, and was a member of Bangladesh's squad in the 2008 Under-19 Cricket World Cup. He made his first-class debut for Chittagong Division in October 2008.

References

External links

1990 births
Living people
Bangladeshi cricketers
Chittagong Division cricketers
Fortune Barishal cricketers
Rangpur Division cricketers
Comilla Victorians cricketers
Dhaka Dominators cricketers
Prime Bank Cricket Club cricketers
Kala Bagan Krira Chakra cricketers
Kala Bagan Cricket Academy cricketers
Bangladesh North Zone cricketers
Barisal Division cricketers
Bangladesh under-23 cricketers
People from Gaibandha District